Major-General Sir Alexander Andrew Wilson KCB (29 October 1858 – 7 July 1937) was a senior British Army officer, Colonel of the Argyll and Sutherland Highlanders and Lieutenant Governor of Jersey between the years 1916 and 1920.

Military career
Educated at Lancing College, Wilson was gazetted into the Argyll and Sutherland Highlanders in 1879 and served with the regiment through the Anglo-Zulu War of 1879 before being appointed Commandant of Colonial Forces, Western Australia in 1895.

Wilson returned from Australia to fight with his regiment during the Second Boer War and was appointed commander of the 1st Battalion after the Battle of Magersfontein in 1899. He served under Sir John Maxwell in the Sinai and Palestine campaign (World War I) as General Officer Commanding Indian Expeditionary Force E, Canal Defences and was mentioned in dispatches whilst commanding the Suez Canal defences against the Turkish attack through 1915–1916. He was also appointed KCB at around this time.

In later life he became Colonel of the Regiment (Argyll and Sutherland Highlanders) and was made Lieutenant Governor of Jersey.

He married Jane Leith-Hay Graham, daughter of Robert Graham, 14th of Fintry. Their son Alexander Robert Graham Wilson  was commander of the 1st Battalion, Argyll and Sutherland Highlanders.

References

1858 births
1937 deaths
Military personnel from Suffolk
Argyll and Sutherland Highlanders officers
British Army personnel of the Anglo-Zulu War
British Army personnel of the Second Boer War
British Army generals of World War I
Knights Commander of the Order of the Bath
People educated at Lancing College
Governors of Jersey
British Army major generals